The Festival of Dangerous Ideas (FODI) is Australia's original disruptive festival that encourages debate and critical thinking, co-founded in 2009 by The Ethics Centre (formerly known as the St James Ethics Centre) held in Sydney, Australia.

History 
The festival was presented at Sydney Opera House for eight years. When it was created, the festival aimed to bring leading thinkers and culture creators from around Australia and the world to discuss and debate important issues.

2009
In the inaugural 2009 event, the festival's opening address was given by atheism advocate Christopher Hitchens on the topic of "Religion Poisons Everything", which was countered by Australian Roman Catholic Cardinal George Pell in a session titled "Without God We Are Nothing".

Participants 

 Keysar Trad (Muslim advocate)
 George Pell (Australian Roman Catholic Cardinal)
 Christopher Hitchens (Atheism advocate)
 Germaine Greer (Feminist)
 Susan Greenfield (Neuroscientist)
 Dambisa Moyo (African-futurist economist) The New York Times dubbed "Anti-Bono"
 Greg Barns (Columnist)
 Oliver Marc Hartwich (Economist)
 Norm Stamper former Chief of the Seattle Police Department
 Cassandra Wilkinson (President of FBi Radio)
 John Humphreys (libertarian economist)
 Chris Barrie (Retired admiral)

2010

Participants

 Alan Dershowitz
 Geoffrey Robertson
 Waleed Aly
 Annabel Crabb
 Elizabeth Farrelly
 Miriam Lyons
 Marcus Westbury
 John Quiggin
 P.W. Singer
 Andrew Leigh
 Tariq Ali
 Ross Gittins
 Paul McGeough
 David Hetherington
 Luke Malpass
 Tom Switzer
 Steve Biddulph
 Cordelia Fine
 Clive Hamilton
 Eric Kaufmann
 Rebecca Huntley
 David Marr
 Chris Taylor
 Marcus Westbury
 Lenore Skenazy
 Hugh Mackay
 John Keane
 Anne Manne
 Fred Chaney
 Julian Morrow

2011 

Participants

 Julian Assange
 Alexander McCall Smith
 Jonathan Safran Foer
 Jon Ronson
 Mike Daisey
 Marc Thiessen
 Emmanuel Jal
 Kate Adie
 Christopher Ryan
 Andrew Leigh
 Slavoj Žižek
 Salil Shetty
 Mona Eltahawy
 Lisa Pryor
 Samah Hadid
 Catherine Lumby
 Roy Masters
 Michael Kirby
 Alison Broinwski
 Rebecca Huntley
 Richard Denniss
 David Marr
 Alan Noble
 Martin Rogers
 Alec Cameron
 Jim Wallace
 Cheryl Kernot
 Philip Nitschke
 Dick Smith
 Julian Burnside
 Simon Sheikh
 Bronwyn Fredericks
 Aileen Moreton-Robinson
 Stephanie Alexander
 Gabrielle Hamilton
 Appelspiel

2012 

Participants

 Sam Harris
 Illan Pappe
 Germaine Greer
 Tim Harford
 Jason Silva
 Joe Hildebrand
 Gideon Haigh
 Jesse Bering
 Bishop Julian Porteous
 Jane Bussmann
 Eliza Griswold
 Ed Howker
 Shiv Malik
 Alberto Giubilini
 Francesca Minerva
 Peter Fitzsimons
 Simon Laham
 Corman Cullinan
 Guy Pearse
 Appelspiel
 Brian Morris
 Alec Doomadgee
 Samah Hadid
 Ronnie Chan
 Li Cunxin
 Geoffrey Garrett
 Jianying Zha
 Stan Grant
 Pasi Sahlberg
 Eva Cox
 Tara Moss
 Richard Heinberg
 Michael Anderson
 Chris Leithner

2013 
Participants

 David Simon
 Hanna Rosin
 Evgeny Morozov
 Vandana Shiva
 Lawrence Krauss
 Peter Rollins
 Peter Hitchens
 Arlie Hochschild
 Dan Savage
 Kirby Ferguson
 John Safran
 Erwin James
 Peter Moskos
 Mustafa Bargouthi
 Conrad Black
 Malcolm Knox
 Christos Tsiolkas
 Patricia Edgar
 Dennis Altman
 James Fallows
 Joe Hildebrand
 James O'Loghlin
 Julian Burnside
 Chris Berg
 Emily Maguire
 Simran Sethi

2014 
The 2014 festival was criticised due to the links between the St James Ethics Centre and companies that profit from the mandatory indefinite detention of asylum seekers.

Participants

 Masha Alekhina
 Liz Ann MacGregor
 Bettina Arndt
 David Baker
 Peter Berner
 Lydia Cacho
 Mark Carnegie
 Jane Caro
 Bob Carr
 Simon Crerar
 Kirsten Drysdale
 Tim Duggan
 Kajsa Ekis Ekman
 Whitney Fitzsimmons
 Kitty Flanagan
 Tim Flannery
 Malcolm Fraser
 Peter Fray
 Bradley Garrett
 Masha Gessen
 Peter Hartcher
 John Hewson
 Lewis Hobba
 Kay Hymowitz
 Dan Ilic
 Nöelle Janaczewska
 Elizabeth Kolbert
 Mark Latham
 Anne Manne
 Francesca Minerva
 Natasha Mitchell
 Rebecca Newberger Goldstein
 Emily Nussbaum
 Alissa Nutting
 Dave O'Neil
 Gordon Parker
 John Pilger
 Steven Pinker
 Elizabeth Pisani
 Huw Price
 Glenn Robbins
 Chip Rolley
 Sir Salman Rushdie
 Mark Scott
 Judith Sloan
 Tom Switzer
 Jaan Tallinn
 Nadya Tolokonnikov
 Stella Young
 Ragip Zarakolu

2015
In 2015, the seventh Festival of Dangerous Ideas was made up of solo sessions and panels featuring speakers such as Tariq Ali, Naomi Klein, Peter Greste, Gabriella Coleman, Sarai Walker, AC Grayling, Marc Lewis, Paul Krugman, Laurie Penny, Jon Ronson, Eric Schlosser and Gideon Raff. For the first time, FODI Melbourne also took place as part of the Melbourne Writers Festival.

Participants

 Tariq Ali
 Professor Frank Brennan
 Anna Broinowski
 James Colley
 Peter C. Doherty
 Clementine Ford
 Martin Ford
 Damon Gameau
 Dennis Glover
 AC Grayling
 Peter Greste
 Johann Hari
 Dan Ilic
 James Jericho
 Dr Helen Joyce
 Suki Kim
 Michael Kirby
 Naomi Klein
 Paul Krugman
 Marc Lewis
 Miriam Lyons
 Jane Martin
 Chris Munro
 Malarndirri McCarthy
 Kate McCartney
 Laurie Penny
 Gideon Raff
 Helen Razer
 Jon Ronson
 John Safran
 Eric Schlosser
 Jordan Shanks
 Rebecca Shaw
 Sarai Walker
 Michael Wesley
 Sarah Wilson
 Murong Xuecun
 The Moth

2016
In 2016, the Festival of Dangerous Ideas was held at the Sydney Opera House for the final time. It featured speakers such as Jesse Bering, Andrew Bolt, Molly Crabapple, Alicia Garza (Black Lives Matter), Henry Rollins (Black Flag) and Lionel Shriver.

Participants

 John Bell (Australian actor)
 Jesse Bering
 Andrew Bolt
 Raewyn Connell
 Molly Crabapple
 Annabel Crabb
 Stephen Dank
 Satyajit Das
 Pat Dudgeon
 Tobias Feakin
 Cordelia Fine
 Tim Flannery
 Lisa Forrest
 Alicia Garza (Black Lives Matter)
 Bates Gill
 Priyamvada Gopal
 Kevan Gosper
 Stan Grant (journalist)
 A.C. Grayling
 Germaine Greer
 Lev Grossman
 Tracey Holmes
 Sarah Houbolt
 Shanto Iyengar
 Simon Jackman
 Alok Jha
 Miranda Johnson
 Michael Kirby (judge)
 Brian Lipson
 Sheryn Lee
 Philippe Legrain
 Ming Long
 Hamish Macdonald
 Dee Madigan
 David Marr
 Jason Mazanov
 Jane McAdam
 Lloyd Newson
 Norman Ornstein
 George Packer
 Jennifer Rayner
 John Elder Robison
 Henry Rollins
 Alexei Sayle
 Laura Secor
 Lionel Shriver
 Tim Soutphommasane
 Neil Strauss
 Lee Vinsel
 Sheila Watt-Cloutier
 Daniel Webb
 Jennifer Whelan

2017
In 2017 the Sydney Opera House announced that it was no longer presenting the Festival of Dangerous Ideas. It announced ANTIDOTE: a festival of art, ideas and action featuring speakers such as Janet Mock, Reni Eddo-Lodge, Tamika D. Mallory (Women's March on Washington) and Micah M. White (Occupy Wall Street) and artists such as Noemi Lakmaier, Anne Collod and Kaleider.

2018
In 2018 the Festival of Dangerous Ideas was independently presented by The Ethics Centre on Cockatoo Island. It featured two days of discussions on internet sub-cultures, fascism, privacy and LSD. In addition, there was a special event at Sydney Town Hall with Stephen Fry. Speakers included Niall Ferguson, Pankaj Mishra, Megan Phelps-Roper, Zeynup Tufecki, Seth Stephens-Davidowitz, Ayelet Waldman,, Germaine Greer, Toby Walsh, Nikki Goldstein and Xanthe Mallett. The 2018 festival also saw the inaugural Festival of Dangerous Art which included artists Betty Grumble, Garth Knight and Riley Harmon.

Participants

 Adam Ni
 Angela Nagle
 Ayelet Waldman
 Chuck Klosterman
 Donna Green
 Germaine Greer
 Darren Goodsir
 Haris Aziz
 Jeremy Moss
 Judith Sloan
 Khandis Blake
 Linda Jakobson
 Matt Beard
 Megan Phelps-Roper
 Mick Dodson
 Niall Ferguson
 Nikki Goldstein
 Pankaj Mishra
 Rebecca Huntley
 Richard Holden
 Riley Harmon
 Rob Brooks
 Rosalind Dixon
 Seth Stephens-Davidowitz
 Stephen Fry
 Susan Dodds
 Toby Walsh
 Xanthe Mallett
 Tim Soutphommasane
 Zeynep Tufekci
 Zhao Hai

2020
Australia's original provocative ideas festival was set to return in 2020 for its 10th festival. It was set to be held at Sydney Town Hall and themed around "dangerous realities". In March 2020, the festival was cancelled due to the coronavirus pandemic as the NSW Minister of Health issued a ban of non-essential public gatherings of over 500 people. In May, the festival launched FODI Digital. Speakers included Kevin Rudd, Daisy Jeffrey, David A. Sinclair, Eleanor Gordon-Smith, Stan Grant, and Tim Soutphommasane. A second series of FODI Digital conversations were launched in September 2020 featuring Edward Snowden, Marcia Langton, and David Wallace-Wells.

2022
In 2022 the Festival of Dangerous Ideas returned live and in person at Carriageworks, presented by The Ethics Centre. Occurring over two days in September, the program featured over 72 speakers and artists, including 8 international guests, with discussions on authoritarianism, social networks, politics, artificial intelligence and algorithms, gender, and the Enlightenment. Speakers included Frances Haugen, Steven Pinker, Jacqui Lambie, Kevin Roose, Alok Vaid-Menon, Adam Tooze, Ruth Ben-Ghiat and Badiucao. The lineup also offered a range of art and experiences including Scott Campbell's Whole Glory, Counterpilot and Legs on the Wall.

Participants

 Waleed Aly
 Brook Andrew
 Badiucao
 Ruth Ben-Ghiat
 Joanna Bourke
 Daniel Browning
 Nick Bryant
 Scott Campbell
 Jane Caro
 Damien Cave
 Corrie Chen
 Claire G. Coleman
 Counterpilot
 Geraldine Doogue
 Stan Grant
 Osher Günsberg
 Frances Haugen
 Jess Hill
 Lewis Hobba
 Dan Ilic
 Narelda Jacobs
 Lydia Khalil
 Jacqui Lambie
 Legs on the Wall
 Simon Longstaff
 Hamish Macdonald
 David McBride
 Kylie Moore-Gilbert
 Ann Mossop
 Sisonke Msimang
 Saxon Mullins
 Lucy Peach
 Steven Pinker
 Yasmin Poole
 Kevin Roose
 Adam Tooze
 Alok Vaid-Menon
 Toby Walsh
 Don Weatherburn
 Cathy Wilcox

Podcast
In February 2022, FODI released a bold new podcast FODI: The In-Between, an audio time capsule recording a moment in-between two eras. Eight conversations between 16 of the world’s biggest thinkers, with guest speakers including Stephen Fry, Roxane Gay, Waleed Aly, Peter Singer, Slavoj Žižek, Naomi Klein and more, FODI: The In-Between tackles the big issues of the world and future, from climate change and global politics to artificial intelligence, truth, and social media.

References

External links 
 
 YouTube channel
 SOH 2011 Festival of Dangerous Ideas Sydney Morning Herald 27 September 2011
 Audio Coverage in BBC's The Forum. 11 October 2009.
 Garry Maddox, SMH
 Steph Harmon, Guardian Australia

Dangerous Ideas
Dangerous Ideas
Recurring events established in 2009
2009 establishments in Australia